These Amazing Shadows is a 2011 documentary film which tells the history and importance of the National Film Registry, a roll call of American cinema treasures that reflects the diversity of film, and indeed the American experience itself.

The documentary was directed by Paul Mariano and Kurt Norton and was an official selection of the 2011 Sundance Film Festival in the Documentary Premieres category.

These Amazing Shadows is distributed under the Independent Film Channel (IFC) brand, Sundance Selects, and was broadcast on the American television PBS series, Independent Lens, on December 29, 2011.

Cast
 Christopher Nolan, director
 Rob Reiner, director
 Barbara Kopple, director
 John Waters, director
 Leonard Maltin, critic and author
 Julie Dash, director
 John Lasseter, director
 George Takei, actor
 Tim Roth, actor
 Peter Coyote, actor
 John Singleton, director
 Gale Anne Hurd, producer
 Wayne Wang, director
 Steve James, director
 Robin Blaetz, Chair of Film Studies, Mount Holyoke College
 John Ptak, producer
 Nina Paley, animator
 Debbie Reynolds, actress
 Robert Rosen, retired dean of the UCLA School of Theater, Film and Television
 James Schamus, producer
 James H. Billington, The Librarian of Congress
 Rick Prelinger, archivist
 Patrick Loughney, Chief, Library of Congress Packard Campus for Audio-Visual Conservation
 George Willeman, Nitrate Vault Manager, Library of Congress Packard Campus for Audio-Visual Conservation
 Stephen C. Leggett, coordinator, National Film Registry of the Library of Congress
 Liz Stanley, archivist, Library of Congress Packard Campus for Audio-Visual Conservation
 Jennifer Horne, Associate Professor, The Catholic University of America
 Caleb Deschanel, cinematographer
 Zooey Deschanel, actress
 Kevin Yost, editor
 Stephen Peck, director, USVETS
 Mick LaSalle, critic and author
 Michael Smith, director, American Indian Film Festival
 Jan-Christopher Horak, director, UCLA Film and Television Archive
 Jeff Adachi, filmmaker
 Arlene Damron, daughter of filmmaker Dave Tatsuno
 Jay Carr, critic and author
 Anthony Slide, historian and author
 Del Reisman, writer
 Jennifer Hagar, animator
 Robert Harris, film restorer
 Allen Daviau, cinematographer
 Martin Cohen, head of post-production for Paramount Studios
 Amy Heckerling, director
 Antonia Lant, professor, New York University
 Barry Jenkins, director
 Heather Linville, preservationist, The Academy Film Archive
 John Magary, director
 Roger Mayer, retired studio executive
 Eric J. Schwartz, attorney
 Betsy McLane, professor and author
 Farran Nehme, writer
 Jennifer Phang, director
 Paul Schrader, writer and director
 Shelly Stamp, professor, University of California, Santa Cruz
 Jan Yarbrough, colorist, Warner MPI
 Amanda Wyss, actress

Production
These Amazing Shadows was filmed in New York City, San Francisco, California, Culpeper, Virginia, Los Angeles, California and Washington, District of Columbia. Paul Mariano, Kurt Norton and Christine O'Malley are the producers of the documentary.

Graphic design and motion graphics by Brian Oakes of New York City. Oakes was assisted by motion graphics artist Natella Kataev. Brian Oakes directed, JIM: The James Foley Story (2016).

Producer Christine O'Malley (with husband Patrick Creadon) credits include the documentaries Wordplay (2006), I.O.U.S.A. (2008), If You Build It (2014), and All Work No Play (2015).

Cinematographer Frazer Bradshaw director of photography credits include the documentary, Babies and Informant. Bradshaw directed, Everything Strange and New, which was nominated for a 2011 Independent Spirit Awards for Best First Feature and a 2009 Gotham Awards for Breakthrough Director; won the 2009 CineVision Award, 2009 Marlon Riggs Award and 2009 San Francisco International Film Festival FIPRESCI Prize.

Co-editor Doug Blush. His editing credits include the Best Documentary Oscar nominee The Invisible War (2012), Best Documentary Oscar-winning Twenty Feet from Stardom (2013), and Bes Original Song nominee The Hunting Ground (2015).

Co-editor Alex Calleros is part owner of the film production company, Finite Films, along with Michael Tucker and Ryan McDuffie. Calleros was the lead editor on the documentary, Being George Clooney (2016).

Color grading by Chris Martin of SpyPost, San Francisco, California.

Post production supervisor by Matt Radecki of Different by Design, Los Angeles, California.

Legal services by Michael C. Donaldson of Donaldson & Callif, Los Angeles, California.

Sound re-recording by Laurence A. Ellis, C.A.S. of MaxPost, Los Angeles, California.

These Amazing Shadows trailer was cut by Stephen Garrett of Kinetic Trailers of New York City.

Music  

Peter Golub (Countdown to Zero) scored These Amazing Shadows during the fall of 2010. The music was performed by the City of Prague Philharmonic Orchestra (conducted byRichard Hein) and recorded at the Smecky Studios in Prague, Czech Republic.

The score was orchestrated by Peter Golub and Philip Klein, edited by Scott Johnson, contracted by Ted Hinkley, recorded by Michael Pekarek and the music preparation was done by Nicholas Greer. Mr. Golub was assisted in Prague by Czech translator, Staniaslave Vomacko.

Track listing

All tracks written and composed by Peter Golub.

Festival Screenings
 Official Selection 2011 Sundance Film Festival
 Official Selection 2011 Boulder International Film Festival – February 2011
 Official Selection 2011 Ashland Independent Film Festival – April 2011
 Official Documentary Competition 2011 Cleveland International Film Festival – March 2011
 Official Selection 2011 Newport Beach Film Festival – April 2011
 Official Selection 2011 Tiburon International Film Festival – April 2011
 Official Selection 2011 Seattle International Film Festival – May 2011
 Official Selection 2011 Indianapolis International Film Festival - July 2011
 Official Selection 2011 RiverRun International Film Festival - April 2011
 Official Selection 2011 Stony Brook Film Festival - July 2011
 Official Selection 2011 White Sands International Film Festival - August 2011
 Official Selection 2011 Aspen Filmfest - September 2011
 Official Selection 2011 Port Townsend Film Festival - September 2011
 Official Selection 2011 Louisville's International Festival of Film - October 2011
 Official Selection 2011 Tacoma Film Festival - October 2011
 Official Selection 2011 Duke City DocFest - October 2011
 Official Selection 2011 Heartland Film Festival - November 2011
 Official Selection 2011 Lucerne International Film Festival - October 2011
 Official Selection 2011 Savannah Film Festival - October 2011
 Official Selection 2011 Indie Memphis Film Festival - November 2011
 Official Selection 2011 Prescott Film Festival - November 2011
 Official Selection 2011 Inverness Film Festival - November 2011
 Official Selection 2011 St. Louis International Film Festival - November 2011
 Official Selection 30th International Festival of Films on Art - March 2012
 Official Selection 2012 Mendocino Film Festival - June 2012
 Official Selection 2012 Transatlantyk - Poznan International Film and Music Festival - August 2012

Awards
 CINE Golden Eagle Award - December 2011
 Best Documentary Savannah Film Festival 2011 - December 2011
 Best Documentary Louisville's International Festival of Film 2011 - December 2011

Reception
The film holds a 75% approval rating from critics on Review aggregator Rotten Tomatoes based on 12 reviews.

David Rooney of The Hollywood Reporter gave it a positive review, and wrote this "inspiring documentary makes an illuminating case for this vital institution as America’s time capsule and family album."

See also
 National Film Registry

References

External links
 
 Official These Amazing Shadows Blog
 
 Sundance Selects/IFC These Amazing Shadows Page
 These Amazing Shadows site for Independent Lens on PBS
 Classic Movies Review (KC) of These Amazing Shadows

2011 films
American documentary films
Documentary films about films
Documentary films about the cinema of the United States
Film preservation
2010s English-language films
2010s American films